The Federation of Rhodesia and Nyasaland was a short lived semi-independent state in southern Africa that existed from 1953 to the end of 1963. The state comprised the former self-governing colony of Southern Rhodesia and the British protectorates of  Northern Rhodesia and Nyasaland. It issued its own revenue stamps from around 1953 to 1955, and these were withdrawn after the federation ceased to exist.

In 1953 or 1954 a numeral design simply inscribed RHODESIA AND NYASALAND REVENUE and the value was issued. Nine values were issued in all, ranging from 6d to £5. None of these are common, and the high values are particularly scarce. In 1955, the Federation issued three excise stamps for use on cigarette packets. These are quite rare as they were usually torn when used.

See also
Postage stamps and postal history of the Federation of Rhodesia and Nyasaland
Revenue stamps of Rhodesia
Revenue stamps of Nyasaland and Malawi

References

External links
Rhodesia Revenues as Exhibited by Sandy Jardine

Economy of Malawi
Economy of Zambia
Economy of Zimbabwe
Rhodesia and Nyasaland
Federation of Rhodesia and Nyasaland
Philately of Zimbabwe
Philately of Malawi